Marilyn Nash (October 26, 1926 – October 6, 2011) was an American actress and casting director. She was best known for starring in the 1947 Charlie Chaplin film Monsieur Verdoux.

Early life
Nash was born in Flint, Michigan, and attended the University of Arizona with the intention of pursuing medicine as her chosen career. However, her professional career path changed when she traveled to Los Angeles with her mother while attending Arizona.

Career
By chance, Nash met Charlie Chaplin while playing tennis at the Beverly Hills Hotel. Chaplin quickly signed Nash as an actress in his Charlie Chaplin Studios. He then cast her in his black comedy Monsieur Verdoux, which was released in 1947.

Nash appeared in just one other film during her career, the 1951 science fiction adventure Unknown World, in which she portrayed a doctor. She then switched to television and stage roles during the 1950s. Her television credits include Hopalong Cassidy in 1952 and Medic in 1955.

She moved to Oroville, located in northern California, with her second husband, Dr. Donald P. Franks. There Nash worked as a casting director, specializing specifically in films shot in the region surrounding Oroville. Her casting credits included The Great Smokey Roadblock, The Klansman and The Outlaw Josey Wales.

Personal life
Nash was married three times. Her first husband was screenwriter Philip Yordan, who introduced her to Hollywood's highest echelons. Nash's marriage to Yordan ended in divorce in the early 1950s. Her second marriage was to Dr. Donald P. Franks, with whom she moved to Oroville. Nash's third marriage to Mack Hill ended sadly with Hill's death.

Nash was interviewed in the 2007 documentary, Spine Tingler! The William Castle Story, directed by Jeffrey Schwarz, which focused on the life of her longtime friend, William Castle. Her first husband, Philip Yordan, had introduced Nash to Castle during the 1950s.

Death
Marilyn Nash died on October 6, 2011, at the age of 84. She was survived by four sons and six grandchildren. Her memorial service was held at the St. Augustine of Canterbury Anglican Church in Chico, California.

Filmography

References

External links

Interview with Nash from 1997 ("Disc Features" on Criterion Collection of Monsieur Verdoux); accessed November 17, 2017.

Family obituary originally published in the Chico Enterprise-Record
2005 interview in The Astounding B monster website

1926 births
2011 deaths
University of Arizona alumni
American film actresses
American television actresses
American stage actresses
American casting directors
Women casting directors
Actresses from California
Actresses from Michigan
People from Oroville, California
Actors from Flint, Michigan
21st-century American women